Roman Prošek (born August 2, 1980) is a Czech professional ice hockey defenceman. He played with HC Karlovy Vary in the Czech Extraliga during the 2010–11 Czech Extraliga season.

References

External links

1980 births
Czech ice hockey defencemen
HC Karlovy Vary players
Living people
Sportspeople from Karlovy Vary
HC Baník Sokolov players
HC Olomouc players
BK Mladá Boleslav players
Piráti Chomutov players
Lillehammer IK players
Sportovní Klub Kadaň players
HC Most players
Czech expatriate ice hockey people
Expatriate ice hockey players in Norway
Czech expatriate sportspeople in Norway